Indigenous New Zealanders can refer to:

 Māori people, the native population of the main islands of New Zealand.
 Cook Islanders
 The Moriori people, of the Chatham Islands